Kamagni is a 1987 Indian Hindi-language film directed by Ashok Kumar, starring Tina Munim, Partha Sarathi Bhattacharya, and Alok Nath.

Plot

Cast
Tina Munim
Partha Sarathi Bhattacharya
Alok Nath
Ashalata
Ramesh Deo
Seductive stills of Alka Nupur were used for film's publicity despite her not being in the film. This angered her.

Soundtrack
Lyrics: Indeevar

References

External links
 

1987 films
1980s Hindi-language films
Films scored by Ilaiyaraaja